Arundathi is a 2016-2017 Tamil-language mystery soap opera that aired on Raj TV from 10 October 2016 to 6 January 2017 at 8:00PM IST for 75 episodes. The show starred Reshmi, Senthinathan, Adhithiya, Udhay, Sekar, S. Priya, Shri and among others.

Synopsis

Cast

 Rashmi Prabhakar as Sanghavi
 Senthilnathan as Selvendran
 Adhithiya
 Udhay
 Sekar
 Priya as Ambika
 Shreekumar
 Vijikanna
 Bhagyalakshmi
 Vijayalakshmi
 Serin as Kamini
 Subashree as Inspector Malavika
 Amutha
 Makesh
 Naveen
 Manikanda Raj
 Nakesh
 Suresh
 Karuna
 Pirabu
 Sashikumar Subramanium

Original soundtrack

Soundtrack

References

External links
 Raj TV Official Site 

Raj TV television series
Tamil-language mystery television series
Tamil-language thriller television series
2016 Tamil-language television series debuts
2010s Tamil-language television series
Tamil-language television shows
2017 Tamil-language television series endings